Celta Vigo contested La Liga and the Copa del Rey in the 1996–97 season. They placed 16th in La Liga, their worst result since earning promotion in 1992. They were more successful in the Copa del Rey, reaching the semi-finals for the second time in four seasons before being eliminated by eventual runners-up Real Betis.

Squad

Left club during season

Squad stats 
Last updated on 16 February 2021.

|-
|colspan="14"|Players who have left the club after the start of the season:

|}

Results

La Liga

League table

Position by round

Matches

Copa del Rey

Second round 

Celta Vigo won 4–2 on aggregate

Third round 

Celta Vigo won 4–2 on aggregate

Round of 16 

1–1 on aggregate. Celta Vigo won on away goals

Quarter-finals 

Celta Vigo won 3–1 on aggregate

Semi-finals 

Real Betis won 2–1 on aggregate

References

External links 
Spain 1996/97 at RSSSF

RC Celta de Vigo seasons
Celta